Sawhill Run is a  long 2nd order tributary to Buffalo Creek in Washington County, Pennsylvania.  This is the only stream of this name in the United States.

Course
Sawhill Run rises about 1.5 miles south of Claysville, Pennsylvania, in Washington County and then flows generally east to join Buffalo Creek about 3 miles southeast of Claysville.

Watershed
Sawhill Run drains  of area, receives about 40.5 in/year of precipitation, has a wetness index of 300.98, and is about 57% forested.

See also
List of Pennsylvania Rivers

References

Rivers of Pennsylvania
Rivers of Washington County, Pennsylvania